Vendetta is a 2013 British action thriller film written and directed by Stephen Reynolds and starring Roxanne McKee, Danny Dyer, Vincent Regan, and Bruce Payne.

Premise
Special ops interrogation officer Jimmy Vickers (Danny Dyer) tracks down a gang who slaughtered his parents while avoiding being found by his old unit and the cops.
With the help of friends PC Griffin and Freddy, he tracks down each gang member and conducts on each a different form of brutal torture.

Cast
Danny Dyer as Jimmy Vickers
Roxanne McKee as Morgan
Vincent Regan as Colonel Leach
Bruce Payne as Mr Rooker
Nick Nevern as Freddy
Ricci Harnett as Sergeant Joe Windsor
Lucy Drive as Catherine Hopkins
Josef Altin as Rob
Emma Samms as Sandra Vickers
Alistair Petrie as DCI Spencer Holland
Charlie Bond as Kerry
Tony Denham as George Vickers
Tamaryn Payne as PC Jenny Clarke
Anna Brecon as Julia
James Mullinger as Alex
Sam Kane as Dennis
Tyrese Abbott as Chow
Elijah Baker as Joshua Evans

Release and reception
The film was released in a few select cinemas in the UK on 22 November 2013 (where it was the most successful Danny Dyer film since Dead Man Running) and on DVD and Blu-ray on 23 December 2013. Reviews were distinctly polarised but the film was widely praised for its high production values. Rob James, writing for Total Film gave the film a score of 3 out 5 and stated that "viewed as a Brit answer to '70s and '80s exploitation flicks, endless Seagal movies and First Blood (Dyer is rogue SAS; his colonel issues Trautman-esque warnings), it's surprisingly decent". Stuart Wright, who reviewed the film for Britflicks, also gave it a score of 3 out 5 and stated that 'the plot and action rattle along with a few reversals of expectations along the way to keep you guessing'. Drew McIntyre, who reviewed the film for UKFilmNews, gave the film 3.7 out of 5 and stated that it "is a modern British thriller and stands comparison easily with the other good UK based thrillers of 2013 such as Welcome to the Punch and Hummingbird". In contrast Tim Robey, writing for the Daily Telegraph stated that it is 'jaw-droppingly awful' and gave it one star out of five. Peter Bradshaw, writing for The Guardian, stated that 'Danny Dyer does his patented Dyer stare all the way through this bizarre and ludicrous piece of revenge porn' and gave it a score of two out of five.

References

External links
 
 

2013 action films
2013 films
British action films
Films set in London
2010s English-language films
2010s British films